Carev Dvor (meaning Emperor's Court) is a village in Resen Municipality in North Macedonia, roughly  from the municipal centre of Resen. It has 605 residents.

Demographics
Carev Dvor is inhabited by Orthodox Macedonians and Muslim Turks. The total population of Carev Dvor has decreased more than half from the 1961 census to the most recent one in 2002. The village has also seen its proportion of Turkish residents drop significantly.

Sports
The village is also home to FK Mladost football club, formerly of the First Macedonian Football League.

People from Carev Dvor 
Cvetko Uzunovski (1916 - 1993), communist and partizan
Kiril of Polog and Kumanovo (1934 - 2013), metropolitan of the Diocese of Polog and Kumanovo of the Macedonian Orthodox Church - Ohrid Archbishopric

References

Villages in Resen Municipality